Acquanetta (born Mildred Davenport; July 17, 1921 – August 16, 2004), nicknamed "The Venezuelan Volcano", was an American B-movie actress during the 1940s and 1950s. Acquanetta was most known for her "exotic" beauty.

Early years
The facts of Acquanetta's origins are not known with certainty. Although accounts differ (some giving her birth-name as Mildred Davenport, from Norristown, Pennsylvania), Acquanetta claimed she was born Burnu Acquanetta, meaning "Burning Fire/Deep Water", in Ozone, Wyoming. Orphaned from her Arapaho parents when she was two (or three), she lived briefly with another family before being taken in by an artistic couple with whom she remained until she made the choice to live independently at the age of fifteen. Other accounts suggest she was a light-skinned African American who concealed her heritage due to the racial discrimination of the era; her career was followed closely by the African American press. In 1942, Life magazine noted her mysterious origins, but reported that she had lived with a Spanish family in Spanish Harlem posing as a Venezuelan before moving to Mexico, then Venezuela to obtain citizenship. The article suggests that the Arapaho orphan story was invented because she was unable to produce any identification for the Screen Actors Guild.

According to the 1940 US Census, she had five siblings, including a sister, Kathryn Davenport, and a brother, Horace Davenport, who was, according to the Pennsylvania Bar Association, "the first African-American judge in Montgomery County."

Film career
Acquanetta started her career as a model in New York City with Harry Conover and John Robert Powers. She signed with Universal Studios in 1942 and acted mostly in B-movies, including Arabian Nights, The Sword of Monte Cristo, Captive Wild Woman and Jungle Woman, in which Universal attempted to create a female monster movie series with Acquanetta as a transformative ape. After her contract with Universal expired, Acquanetta signed on with Monogram Pictures but did not appear in any movies; she then signed with RKO where she acted in her only big-budget movie, Tarzan and the Leopard Woman.

Personal life
In 1947, Acquanetta and "Mexican-Jewish millionaire" Luciano Baschuk had a son, Sergei (variously Sergio), who died of cancer in 1952 at age five, after the couple's bitter divorce in 1950, where she lost her suit for half his fortune when no record of their marriage could be produced. In 1950, Acquanetta married painter and illustrator Henry Clive, who was 40 years her senior, and returned to acting. The couple were divorced in 1953. That year she  retired from films and became a disk jockey for radio station KPOL (AM) in Los Angeles.

By 1955 she had married Jack Ross, a car dealer who later ran for governor of Arizona in 1970 and 1974. The couple settled in Mesa, Arizona, and she returned to a degree of celebrity by appearing with Ross in his local television advertisements, and also by hosting a local television show called Acqua's Corner that accompanied the Friday late-night movies.  The couple were prominent citizens, donating to the Phoenix Symphony and the construction of Mesa Lutheran Hospital and founding Stagebrush Theatre.  She and Ross had four sons together, Lance, Tom, Jack Jr. and Rex, before divorcing in the early 1980s. In 1987, Acquanetta sold the Mesa Grande ruins to the city of Mesa. An apocryphal Phoenix legend has Acquanetta, upon learning of her husband's infidelity, filling the interior of his Lincoln Continental convertible with concrete.

Acquanetta wrote a book of poetry, published in 1974, titled The Audible Silence. She did not smoke, and did not drink alcohol, tea, or coffee.

Acquanetta succumbed to complications of Alzheimer's disease on August 16, 2004, at Hawthorn Court in Ahwatukee, Arizona. She was 83. She is buried in Paradise Memorial Gardens in East Shea, Scottsdale, Arizona.

In popular culture

In 1987, the all-female band The Aquanettas adopted (and adapted) their name from hers. 

Acquanetta's obituary inspired the composer Michael Gordon to collaborate with librettist Deborah Artman on the opera Acquanetta (2005/2017). Produced by Beth Morrison Projects, the chamber version received its world premiere at the Prototype Festival in Brooklyn, New York, in January, 2018.

Opera 

Acquanetta, based on her life, premiered as a Grand Opera in 2006 in Aachen, Germany. The chamber version of Acquanetta had its world premiere at the 2018 Prototype Festival, followed by a subsequent run at Bard SummerScape in 2019.

Filmography

Notes

References

Further reading

  – Features Acquanetta and her connection to the beach party films

External links

20th-century American actresses
Native American actresses
African-American actresses
People from Cheyenne, Wyoming
Deaths from Alzheimer's disease
Actresses from Wyoming
1921 births
2004 deaths
Arapaho people
American film actresses
Deaths from dementia in Arizona
People from East Harlem
20th-century African-American women
20th-century African-American people